The Boys' Club of Pittsburgh is a historic building in the Lawrenceville neighborhood of Pittsburgh, Pennsylvania. Built in 1912 as the Lawrenceville YMCA, the three-story building was designed by local architect Robert Trimble and originally included a gymnasium, swimming pool, bowling alley, and dormitories. In 1928 the building was sold to the Pittsburgh Boys' Club, which became part of the Boys & Girls Clubs of America. The Boys & Girls Club continued to use the building until 2000, when a new facility was completed two blocks away. Subsequently, the older building was occupied by a charter school until 2014 and then converted into apartments. It was listed on the National Register of Historic Places in 2018.

References

Clubhouses on the National Register of Historic Places in Pennsylvania
Clubhouses in Pittsburgh
Buildings and structures completed in 1912
National Register of Historic Places in Pittsburgh
Lawrenceville (Pittsburgh)
YMCA buildings in the United States